Zayed National Museum is a planned museum, to be located in Abu Dhabi, the UAE. It is designed as a memorial to the late Zayed bin Sultan Al Nahyan, the founding father and first president of the UAE. The museum is planned to be the centrepiece of the Saadiyat Island Cultural District, and will showcase the history, culture, and economic transformation of the Emirates.

In 2021, it was announced that the construction, which was interrupted after Arabtec ceased operations, would be taken over by the companies BESIX Group and Trojan Contracting. The museum is currently under construction and as of November 2021, its opening date is scheduled for 2025.

History 
The museum has been designed by Foster + Partners with five solar thermal towers that will act as chimneys to draw cool air through the building. The towers are shaped like falcon wings to commemorate Zayed's love of falconry.

In 2009, the Zayed National Museum signed a ten-year contract with the British Museum.  The British Museum would assist with curation and loan about 500 of its treasures to the Zayed National Museum.  According to The New York Times, the British Museum thinks that it is unlikely that any items will be loaned under the current contract, which ends in 2019. In June 2018, a new partnership was announced between the British Museum and Zayed National Museum. In July 2019, the archaeologist Dr. Peter Magee was appointed Director. 

Its opening has been delayed many times. Scheduled to be complete in 2012, the opening was delayed to 2013, and later 2021.

As of November 2021, the museum is still under construction, with anticipated opening in 2025, coinciding with the opening of the Guggenheim Abu Dhabi.

References

External links 
 Official website

Buildings and structures under construction in Abu Dhabi
Museums in Abu Dhabi
National museums of the United Arab Emirates
Foster and Partners buildings
Proposed museums
Saadiyat Island
Zayed National Museum official Instagram